Arnar Bergmann Gunnlaugsson (born 6 March 1973) is an Icelandic football coach managing Víkingur in the Úrvalsdeild.

He is a retired international player. During his career he enjoyed spells at Leicester City, Stoke City, Bolton Wanderers, IA Akranes, 1. FC Nürnberg, Feyenoord and Dundee United.

Club career
While at Leicester City he played a key role in their victorious 1999–2000 Football League Cup campaign. He made two appearances during the run, and both times came on as a substitute and scored in a penalty shootout; once against Leeds United and once against Fulham. He was not part of Leicester's squad for the 2000 League Cup Final at Wembley, however days after the final he was loaned out to Stoke where he had a second opportunity to play at the stadium; this time starting as Stoke won the 2000 Football League Trophy Final.

International career
As a young player, Arnar made several appearances for the Icelandic international youth teams. Arnar made his debut for Iceland in an April 1993 friendly match against the United States. He went on to earn 32 caps, scoring three goals between 1993 and 2003. His last international match was an April 2003 friendly match against Finland in which he was substituted with Veigar Páll Gunnarsson.

Career statistics

Club
Sources:

International
Source:

Honours

Player
ÍA
Úrvalsdeild: 1992, 1995

Leicester City 
League Cup: 1999–2000

KR
Icelandic Cup: 2003

FH
Úrvalsdeild: 2008
Icelandic Cup: 2007

Individual
Úrvalsdeild Top Scorer: 1992, 1995
Úrvalsdeild Most promising player: 1992

Manager
Víkingur FC
Úrvalsdeild: 2021
Icelandic Cup: 2019, 2021, 2022

Individual
Úrvalsdeild Coach of the Year: 2021

References

External links
 
 

1973 births
Living people
Association football midfielders
Arnar Gunnlaugsson
Arnar Gunnlaugsson
Arnar Gunnlaugsson
Arnar Gunnlaugsson
Feyenoord players
1. FC Nürnberg players
FC Sochaux-Montbéliard players
Bolton Wanderers F.C. players
Leicester City F.C. players
Stoke City F.C. players
Dundee United F.C. players
Arnar Gunnlaugsson
Arnar Gunnlaugsson
Eredivisie players
Premier League players
Scottish Premier League players
2. Bundesliga players
English Football League players
Arnar Gunnlaugsson
Expatriate footballers in the Netherlands
Arnar Gunnlaugsson
Expatriate footballers in Germany
Arnar Gunnlaugsson
Expatriate footballers in France
Expatriate footballers in England
Arnar Gunnlaugsson
Expatriate footballers in Scotland
Arnar Gunnlaugsson
Arnar Gunnlaugsson
Twin sportspeople
Arnar Gunnlaugsson
Arnar Gunnlaugsson
Icelandic football managers